Enrique Guaita (11 July 1910 – 18 May 1959), also known as Enrico Guaita, was an  Italian Argentine footballer who played for both Argentina and Italy as a forward. He helped win the 1933-35 Central European International Cup & the World Cup in 1934 with Italy.

He played most of his footballing career in Argentina with Estudiantes and Racing Club, but also played in Italy with Roma where he was nicknamed Il Corsaro Nero.

Club career
Guaita played for Estudiantes de La Plata, where he was part of the famous attack Los Profesores. In 1934, he moved to Italy, where he probably played his best football. He played two seasons for A.S. Roma from 1933 to 1935. He was the top-scorer of the League in 1934–35, with 28 goals. He became known as Il Corsaro Nero. Fearing being drafted by the Italian army, in 1936, he returned to Argentina, where he played for Racing Club de Avellaneda and, again, Estudiantes de La Plata. He retired at the end of the 1939 season.

International career
Guaita was one of twelve Argentine players to represent both Argentina (four caps, one goal) and Italy (ten caps, five goals) at national level, before the practice of playing for more than one national team was banned. With Argentina, he won the 1937 South American Championship, and with the Italian national team, he scored the only goal in the semifinal match of the 1934 FIFA World Cup against Austria, before Italy went on to win the title on home soil.

Honours

International
Italy
 FIFA World Cup: 1934
 Central European International Cup: 1933-35

Argentina
South American Championship: 1937

Individual
Serie A Capocannoniere: 1934–35 (28 goals)
FIFA World Cup Team of the Tournament: 1934

References

External links

  

1910 births
1959 deaths
Argentine footballers
Argentina international footballers
Argentine people of Italian descent
Argentine people of Spanish descent
Argentine Primera División players
Racing Club de Avellaneda footballers
Estudiantes de La Plata footballers
Italian footballers
Italy international footballers
Expatriate footballers in Argentina
Expatriate footballers in Italy
Serie A players
A.S. Roma players
1934 FIFA World Cup players
FIFA World Cup-winning players
Italian sportspeople of Argentine descent
Italian people of Spanish descent
Dual internationalists (football)
Association football forwards
Sportspeople from Entre Ríos Province